Sabluiyeh or Sebluiyeh or Sabaluiyeh or Sobluiyeh or Sabalooeyeh may refer to:
 Sabluiyeh, Kuhbanan
 Sabluiyeh, Zarand